is a Japanese professional footballer who plays as a winger for Primeira Liga club Casa Pia, on loan from Nagoya Grampus, and the Japan national team.

International career
On 10 December 2019, Soma made his international debut in a 2-1 win against China in the 2019 EAFF E-1 Football Championship. On 22 July 2022, Soma scored his first 2 international goals in a 6-0 win over Hong Kong in the 2022 EAFF E-1 Football Championship.

On 1 November 2022, Soma was included in Japan's 26-man squad for the 2022 FIFA World Cup.

Club statistics
.

Club

International 
 

International goals
Scores and results list Japan's goal tally first.

Honours
Nagoya Grampus
J.League Cup: 2021
Individual
Toulon Tournament Best XI: 2019
EAFF Championship Top goalscorer: 2022
EAFF Championship Most Valuable Player: 2022

Notes

References

External links

1997 births
Living people
Japanese footballers
J1 League players
Nagoya Grampus players
Kashima Antlers players
Association football midfielders
Japan international footballers
Footballers at the 2020 Summer Olympics
Olympic footballers of Japan
2022 FIFA World Cup players